Jaroslav Jabrocký (born April 16, 1980) is a Slovak professional ice hockey player in Slovakia with MHC Martin of the Slovak Extraliga.

References

External links

Living people
1980 births
Slovak ice hockey forwards
Austin Ice Bats players
Corpus Christi Icerays players
HC '05 Banská Bystrica players
HK Poprad players
HK 36 Skalica players
Laredo Bucks players
MHC Martin players
MHK Kežmarok players
MHk 32 Liptovský Mikuláš players
MsHK Žilina players
Piráti Chomutov players
Saryarka Karagandy players
Sportovní Klub Kadaň players
VIK Västerås HK players
Slovak expatriate ice hockey players in the United States
Slovak expatriate ice hockey players in the Czech Republic
Slovak expatriate ice hockey players in Sweden
Expatriate ice hockey players in Kazakhstan
Slovak expatriate sportspeople in Kazakhstan